Tanya van Graan (born 13 December 1983) is a South African actress, singer and model. She is known for her roles in Zulu and Starship Troopers 3: Marauder, and for being FHM's Sexiest Woman at the 2007 FHM 100 Sexiest Women in the World bash held in Johannesburg.

Career
In addition to appearances in South African productions, she appeared in the science fiction film Starship Troopers 3: Marauder, by Edward Neumeier, as Sgt. A. Sunday, alongside Jolene Blalock and Casper Van Dien.

In 2010, she starred in the horror comedy Lost Boys: The Thirst as Lily,  alongside Tanit Phoenix and Corey Feldman. In the same year she played the role of Holly in the action movie Death Race 2 and worked again with Tanit Phoenix in front of the camera as well as its sequel, Death Race: Inferno, released in 2013. In the movie, Graan played the character Amber and stood as before, in addition to Luke Goss, Danny Trejo and Ving Rhames before the camera. All three films of the Death Race series were released as Direct-to-DVD.

In 2013, Van Graan starred as Tara in the thriller movie Zulu of Jérôme Salle, alongside Orlando Bloom and Forest Whitaker.

Personal life
In 2014, Van Graan married Kasper Kristofferson at La Residence in Franschhoek.

Filmography

Film

Television

References

External links
 

1983 births
21st-century South African actresses
Living people
People from Cape Town
21st-century South African women singers
South African female models
South African film actresses
South African television actresses